Parodia is a genus of flowering plants in the family Cactaceae, native to the eastern slopes of the Andes in northwestern Argentina and southwestern Bolivia and in the lowland pampas regions of northeastern Argentina, southern Brazil, eastern Paraguay, and Uruguay. This genus has about 60 species, many of which have been transferred from Eriocactus, Notocactus and Wigginsia. All are deeply ribbed and spiny, with single flowers at or near the crown. Some species produce offsets at the base. They are popular in cultivation, but must be grown indoors where temperatures fall below .

Taxonomy and Systematics
The first description was published in 1923 by the Italian-Argentinian botanist Carlos Luis Spegazzini. The genus is named after Domingo Parodi, one of the early investigators of the flora of Paraguay. The type species is Echinocactus microspermus. Anatomical and morphological work by David Richard Hunt et. al.  and Reto Nyffeler led to the incorporation of the genera Brasilicactus, Brasiliparodia, Eriocactus, Notocactus and Wigginsia into the genus Parodia. These studies also suggested the inclusion of the genera Blossfeldia and Frailea.

According to Reto Nyffeler, the genus Parodia can be divided into three subgenera:

Subgenus Parodia:
Group Parodia: (Parodia s. str.) The shoots are flat spherical, globular or columnar and rarely sprout. A tuber is rarely present. The shoot tissue usually contains no mucilage, the epidermis is usually tender. The areoles are always on the protuberances. The central and radial spines differ significantly from each other. The central spine is sometimes hooked. The flowers are funnel-shaped, styles and stigmas are always the same color. The soft fruits later dry up and open at their base.
Group Notocactus: (Notocactus s.str. + Wigginsia) The shoots are flat spherical, globular or columnar and occasionally sprout. A tuber is sometimes present. The shoot tissue usually contains mucus, the epidermis is often hard. The areoles are located in the depressions between the bumps. The central and radial spines differ. The flowers are broadly funnel-shaped to bell-shaped, styles and stigmas are usually differently colored. The fruits, which are often elongated when ripe, open differently.

Subgenus Eriocactus: The shoots are often long columnar in old age and occasionally sprout. The shoot apex is often crooked. The instinctual tissue contains no mucus. The humps are fused into straight ribs. The areoles are located between the protuberances. They are not sunken or only vaguely sunken and are often heavily woolly. The thorns are more or less bristle-like. The light to dark yellow flowers are broadly bell-shaped, styles and stigmas are the same color. The fruits have a hard pericarp and open at the base.

Subgenus Brasilicactus: The shoots are flat spherical to rarely short columnar. The shoot apex is often crooked. The remarkably soft shoot tissue contains no mucus. The protuberances are separated from each other and arranged in oblique rows or fused into ridges. The round areoles are close together. Central spines are not formed or are occasionally hooked. There are numerous radial spines. They are narrow, funnel-shaped, styles and stigmas are colored the same. The fruits have a thin pericarp and open at their base.

Species
Species of the genus Parodia according to Plants of the World Online  separated into sections according to Reto Nyffeler:

Synonyms

Note that the inclusion of Notocactus (the type genus of the tribe) into Parodia was a move of the International Organization for Succulent Plant Study at the end of the 1980s. This inclusion is still controversial today.

References

 Biolib
 Universal biological indexer

Bibliography
 
 

 

 
Cactoideae genera
Cacti of South America
Taxa named by Carlo Luigi Spegazzini